The 2002 Junior League World Series took place from August 11–17 in Taylor, Michigan, United States. Cartersville, Georgia, USA defeated David, Panama in the championship game.

Teams

Results

United States Pool

International Pool

Elimination Round

References

Junior League World Series
Junior League World Series